Arakapas is a village in the Limassol District of Cyprus, located 5 km west of Eptagoneia.

References

Communities in Limassol District